"All the Same" is a song by Sick Puppies.

All the Same may also refer to:

 "All the Same", a song by Joshua Homme, Nick Oliveri, and Brad Wilk from The Dangerous Lives of Altar Boys soundtrack
 "All the Same", a song by Quasi from Field Studies
 "All the Same", a song by Blue Meanies (Illinois band)
"All the Same", a song by Roam from Backbone